There are two sporting events named the Madrid Masters:
Madrid Open (tennis) – a men's and women's tennis tournament
Madrid Masters (golf)